The Little Patriot is a 1917 American silent drama film directed by William Bertram and starring Marie Osborne, Herbert Standing and Marion Warner.

Cast
 Marie Osborne as The Little Patriot 
 Herbert Standing as Her Grandfather 
 Marion Warner as Her Mother 
 Jack Connolly as Undetermined Role 
 Frank Lanning as Undetermined Role 
 Madge Evans as Undetermined Role

References

Bibliography
  Robin Blaetz. Visions of the Maid: Joan of Arc in American Film and Culture. University of Virginia Press, 2001.

External links

1917 films
1917 drama films
Silent American drama films
Films directed by William Bertram
American silent feature films
1910s English-language films
Pathé Exchange films
American black-and-white films
1910s American films